Lovers' Gang is a 1972 Greek black-and-white film starring Dinos Iliopoulos, Maro Kontou, Nikos Rizos and Kaiti Panou.

Cast
Dinos Iliopoulos ..... Renos Kampanas
Maro Kontou ..... Elena Georgiadou-Vagianou
Nikos Rizos ..... Tzortzis Kotsiras
Kaiti Panou ..... Yvoni Saranti
Aliki Zografou ..... Magda Saltamouri
Vasos Adrianos ..... Alexis Romanos
Panos Velias ..... Giagos Marmarinos
Thanos Martinos ..... Iason Dendis
Andreas Tsakonas ..... Fanouris Tzouras
Vasos Andronidis ..... Sotiriou
Elsa Rizou .....
Gogo Antzoletaki ..... Georgiadou
Mary Farmaki ..... Skentzou

See also
List of Greek films

External links

Symmoria eraston at cine.gr

1972 films
1972 comedy films
Greek comedy films
1970s Greek-language films